The Canadian federal budget for fiscal year 1991-1992 was presented by Minister of Finance Michael Wilson in the House of Commons of Canada on 26 February 1991.

Taxes

Expenditures
The budget announces that the Expenditure Control Plan unveiled in the previous budget is extended:
 The 5 %-growth ceiling for CAP payments to Ontario, Alberta and BC is extended for 3 additional years;
 EPF per-capital entitlements are frozen until 1994-95;
 Several programs are frozen (PUITTA, Telefilm Canada, loans financing by EDC);
 Previously-announced projects are cancelled (contribution to the Toronto Ballet Opera House) or delayed (contribution to new concert halls in Edmonton and Montreal, cultural research institute in Montreal);
 Expenditures for the Green Plan are spread over 6 years instead of 5.

Legislative history
Provisions pertaining to federal transfers  to provinces (EPF and 
PUITTA) and Unemployment Insurance were contained in the Budget Implementation Act, 1991 which received royal assent on 17 December 1991.

Additional expenditure control measures are included in the Bill C-56 (named the Spending Control Act) which was read a third time and adopted by the House of Commons on 27 April 1992 in a 137–84 vote (with 12 paired votes) and received royal assent on 18 June 1992.

References

Official documents 
 
 Budget Speech
 Budget Plan
 Budget in Brief
 
 

Canadian budgets
1991 in Canadian law
1991 government budgets
1991 in Canadian politics